These 183 genera belong to Asilinae, a subfamily of robber flies in the family Asilidae.

Asilinae genera

Abrophila Daniels, 1987
Acasilus Londt, 2005
Afroepitriptus Lehr, 1992
Afromochtherus Lehr, 1996
Albibarbefferia Artigas and Papavero, 1997
Albicoma Lehr, 1986
Alcimus Loew, 1848
Amblyonychus Hermann, 1921
Anacinaces Enderlein, 1914
Anarmostus Loew, 1860
Aneomochtherus Lehr, 1996
Antipalus Loew, 1849
Antiphrisson Loew, 1849
Apoclea Macquart, 1838
Apotinocerus Hull, 1962
Argillemisca Lehr, 1967
Aridefferia Artigas and Papavero, 1997
Aristofolia Ayala Landa, 1978
Artigasus Özdikmen, 2010
Asilella Lehr, 1970
Asiloephesus Lehr, 1992
Asilus Linnaeus, 1758
Asiola Daniels, 1977
Astochia Becker in Becker and Stein, 1913
Atractocoma Artigas, 1970
Blepharotes Duncan, 1840
Caenoura Londt, 2002
Carinefferia Artigas and Papavero, 1997
Carreraomyia Cole, 1969
Cerdistus Loew, 1849
Cerozodus Bigot, 1857
Chilesus Bromley, 1932
Clephydroneura Becker, 1925
Cnodalomyia Hull, 1962
Colepia Daniels, 1987
Congomochtherus Oldroyd, 1970
Conosiphon Becker, 1923
Cratolestes Hull, 1962
Cratopoda Hull, 1962
Ctenodontina Enderlein, 1914
Curvirostris Tomasovic, 2015
Dasophrys Loew, 1858
Dicropaltum Martin, 1975
Didysmachus Lehr, 1996
Dikowmyia Londt, 2002
Diplosynapsis Enderlein, 1914
Dolopus Daniels, 1987
Dysclytus Loew, 1858
Dysmachus Loew, 1860
Dystolmus Lehr, 1996
Eccoptopus Loew, 1860
Eccritosia Schiner, 1866
Echthistus Loew, 1849
Efferia Coquillett, 1893
Eicherax Bigot, 1857
Eichoichemus Bigot, 1857
Ekkentronomyia Ibáñez-Bernal and Fisher, 2015
Engelepogon Lehr, 1992
Epiklisis Becker, 1925
Epipamponeurus Becker, 1919
Erax Scopoli, 1763
Eraxasilus Carrera, 1959
Erebunus Richter, 1966
Eremisca Hull, 1962
Eremonotus Theodor, 1980
Esatanas Lehr, 1986
Etrurus Lehr, 1992
Eutolmus Loew, 1848
Filiolus Lehr, 1967
Gibbasilus Londt, 1986
Glaphyropyga Schiner, 1866
Gongromyia Londt, 2002
Heligmonevra Bigot, 1858
Hippomachus Engel, 1927
Hoplopheromerus Becker, 1925
Irianjaya Koçak & Kemal, 2009
Juxtasilus Londt, 2005
Ktyr Lehr, 1967
Ktyrimisca Lehr, 1967
Kurzenkoiellus Lehr, 1995
Labarus Londt, 2005
Labromyia Hull, 1962
Lecania Macquart, 1838
Leinendera Carrera, 1945
Leleyellus Lehr, 1995
Leptoharpacticus Lynch Arribálzaga, 1880
Lestophonax Hull, 1962
Lochmorhynchus Engel, 1930
Lochyrus Artigas, 1970
Longivena Vieira and Rafael, 2014
Lycomya Bigot, 1857
Lycoprosopa Hull, 1962
Machimus Loew, 1849
Machiremisca Lehr, 1996
Mallophora Macquart, lers)
Martintella Artigas, 1996
Mauropteron Daniels, 1987
Megadrillus Bigot, 1857
Megalometopon Artigas and Papavero, 1995
Megaphorus Bigot, 1857
Melouromyia Londt, 2002
Mercuriana Lehr, 1988
Millenarius Londt, 2005
Minicatus Lehr, 1992
Myaptex Hull, 1962
Myaptexaria Artigas and Papavero, 1995
Negasilus Curran, 1934
Neoaratus Ricardo, 1913
Neocerdistus Hardy, 1926
Neoepitriptus Lehr, 1992
Neoitamus Osten Sacken, 1878
Neolophonotus Engel, 1925
Neomochtherus Osten Sacken, 1878
Neotes Artigas and Papavero, 1995
Nerax Hull, 1962
Nevadasilus Artigas & Papavero, 1995
Nomomyia Artigas, 1970
Notomochtherus Londt, 2002
Odus Lehr, 1986
Oldroydiana Lehr, 1996
Oligoschema Becker, 1925
Orophotus Becker, 1925
Pamponerus Loew, 1849
Papaverellus Artigas and Vieira, 2014
Paramochtherus Theodor, 1980
Pararatus Ricardo, 1913
Pashtshenkoa Lehr, 1995
Phileris Tsacas and Weinberg, 1976
Philodicus Loew, 1847
Philonicus Loew, 1849
Pogonioefferia Artigas and Papavero, 1997
Polacantha Martin, 1975
Polyphonius Loew, 1848
Polysarca Schiner, 1866
Polysarcodes Paramonov, 1937
Porasilus Curran, 1934
Premochtherus Lehr, 1996
Proctacanthella Bromley, 1934
Proctacanthus Macquart, 1838
Proctophoroides Artigas and Papavero, 1995
Prolatiforceps Martin, 1975
Promachella Cole and Pritchard, 1964
Promachus Loew, 1848
Pseuderemisca Lehr, 1986
Pseudophrisson Dürrenfeldt, 1968
Pteralbis Ayala Landa, 1981
Reburrus Daniels, 1987
Regasilus Curran, 1931
Reminasus Lehr, 1979
Rhadinosoma Artigas, 1970
Rhadiurgus Loew, 1849
Robertomyia Londt, 1990
Satanas Jacobson, 1908
Scarbroughia Papavero, 2009
Senoprosopis Macquart, 1838
Sphagomyia Londt, 2002
Stenasilus Carrera, 1960
Stilpnogaster Loew, 1849
Stizolestes Hull, 1962
Strophipogon Hull, 1958
Synolcus Loew, 1858
Taurhynchus Artigas and Papavero, 1995
Templasilus Peris, 1957
Theodoriana Lehr, 1987
Threnia Schiner, 1868
Tolmerus Loew, 1849
Torasilus Londt, 2005
Trichomachimus Engel, 1934
Triorla Parks, 1968
Tsacasia Artigas and Papavero, 1995
Tsacasiella Lehr, 1996
Tuberconspicus Tomasovic, 2013
Tuberculefferia Artigas and Papavero, 1997
Turka Özdikmen, 2008
Ujguricola Lehr, 1970
Valiraptor Londt, 2002
Wilcoxius Martin, 1975
Wygodasilus Artigas and Papavero, 1995
Wyliea Martin, 1975
Yksdarhus Hradsky and Hüttinger, 1983
Zelamyia Londt, 2005
Zosteria Daniels, 1987
Zoticus Artigas, 1970
 † Asilopsis Cockerell, 1920

References

Asilinae